State Road 228 (SR 228) is a  state highway in the northeastern part of the U.S. state of Florida. It exists in two distinct sections, separated by both Baker County Road 228 and Duval CR 228, which are former segments of SR 228.

The western segment of SR 228 exists in Macclenny, connecting US 90 and Baker CR 228 with Interstate 10 (I-10) at exit 336 and another instance of the county road.

Its main segment is in Jacksonville. This segment connects U.S. Route 301 (US 301) and Duval CR 228 in the far southwest corner of the city with US 90 in the Southside neighborhood of the city.

Route description

Western segment
SR 228 begins at an intersection with U.S. Route 90 (US 90, Macclenny Avenue) in downtown Macclenny. At this intersection, the roadway continues as Baker County Road 228 (CR 228; North 5th Street). It heads south-southeast through the city, passing Macclenny City Hall and the Emily Taber Public Library. Around the intersection with Jonathan Street, the road curves to the southeast. It crosses over Turkey Creek before leaving Macclenny. Approximately  after leaving the city, it meets its eastern terminus, an interchange with Interstate 10 (I-10) at exit 336. At this interchange, the roadway continues to the southeast as another instance of CR 228, this time known as Maxville–Macclenny Highway.

Eastern segment

Western terminus to Downtown
SR 228 resumes at an intersection with US 301 in the southwestern corner of Jacksonville. At this intersection, the roadway continues as Duval CR 228 (Maxville–Macclenny Highway). A short distance later, it meets the northern terminus of CR 217. Then, it travels through Cecil Center, passing the Cecil campus of Florida State College. It then has an interchange with SR 23 (First Coast Expressway). The highway passes by Herlong Recreational Airport, before meeting an interchange with I-295 (Jacksonville West Beltway). SR 228 passes Gravely Hill Cemetery and John D. Liverman Park. While passing the park, the highway crosses over Cedar River. Then, it intersects SR 103 (Lane Avenue South). After that, it begins to curve to the east. At the intersection with Cassat Avenue, it takes on the Post Street name. At Hamilton Street, it heads northeast and curves back to the east past Edgewood Avenue. Then, it intersects SR 129 (McDuff Avenue). The two highways head concurrently to the south for about four blocks, to an intersection with US 17 (Roosevelt Boulevard). At this intersection, SR 129 meets its southern terminus, and SR 228 heads concurrently with US 17 to the northeast. Less than  later, the two highways have an interchange with I-10. I-10/US 17/SR 228 heads concurrently to the east. At an interchange with I-95, I-10 meets its eastern terminus, while I-95/US 17/SR 228 head to the northeast, crossing over McCoy Creek. At an interchange with Union Street, US 17/SR 228 splits off to the east, concurrent with US 23. The three highways enter downtown.

Downtown to eastern terminus
At Main Street, they intersect US 1. Here, US 23 meets its southern terminus and SR 228 turns onto US 1 south, while US 17 turns onto US 1 north. One block later, US 90 (West Beaver Street) joins the concurrency. Four blocks farther to the south-southwest, SR 228 splits off onto West Monroe Avenue. One block to the east, at Ocean Street, it intersects the northbound lanes of US 1/US 90/SR 228. A short distance to the east-southeast, SR 228 meets the western terminus of the Hart Bridge Expressway, a freeway that connects downtown to the Southside neighborhood. Here, SR 228 joins with the expressway to the east-southeast. They pass VyStar Veterans Memorial Arena, EverBank Field, and WJCT, before US 1 Alternate (US 1 Alt.; Martin Luther King Jr. Parkway) joins the concurrency. The two highways cross over the St. Johns River on the Hart Bridge. Shortly after the bridge is an interchange with SR 10 (Atlantic Boulevard). Almost immediately, US 1 Alt. splits off onto Emerson Expressway. Then, SR 228 crosses over Little Pottsburg Creek. After that, it has an intersection with SR 109 (University Boulevard). The road continues to the east-southeast and curves to the southeast to meet its eastern terminus, an interchange with US 90 (Beach Boulevard).

National Highway System
There are two sections of SR 228 that is included as part of the National Highway System, a system of roadways important to the nation's economy, defense, and mobility (both of which are part of the eastern segment):
 From its western terminus to I-295
 The entire section that is concurrent with the Hart Bridge Expressway

Major intersections

See also

References

External links
 

228
228
228
228